Albert Cohen may refer to:

Albert Cohen (novelist) (1895–1981), Greek-born Swiss novelist
Albert D. Cohen (1914–2011), Canadian businessman
Albert K. Cohen (1918–2014), American criminologist
Albert Cohen (producer), French film, television and musical producer, and radio personality 
Albert Cohen (actor) (born 1932), Israeli film, stage and voice actor, and singer
Albert Cohen (mathematician) (born 1965), French mathematician

See also
Albert Cohn (disambiguation)
Bert Coan (1940–2022), American football player